Mean sea level (MSL, often shortened to sea level) is an average surface level of one or more among Earth's coastal bodies of water from which heights such as elevation may be measured. The global MSL is a type of vertical datuma standardised geodetic datumthat is used, for example, as a chart datum in cartography and marine navigation, or, in aviation, as the standard sea level at which atmospheric pressure is measured to calibrate altitude and, consequently, aircraft flight levels. A common and relatively straightforward mean sea-level standard is instead the midpoint between a mean low and mean high tide at a particular location.

Sea levels can be affected by many factors and are known to have varied greatly over geological time scales. Current sea level rise is mainly caused by human-induced climate change. When temperatures rise, mountain glaciers and the polar ice caps melt, increasing the amount of water in water bodies. Because most of human settlement and infrastructure was built in response to a more normalized sea level with limited expected change, populations affected by climate change in connection to sea level rise will need to invest in climate adaptation to mitigate the worst effects or when populations are in extreme risk, a process of managed retreat. 

The term above sea level generally refers to above mean sea level (AMSL). The term APSL means above present sea level, comparing sea levels in the past with the level today.

Earth's radius at sea level is 6,378.137 km (3,963.191 mi) at the equator. It is 6,356.752 km (3,949.903 mi) at the poles and 6,371.001 km (3,958.756 mi) on average.

Measurement 

Precise determination of a "mean sea level" is difficult because of the many factors that affect sea level. Instantaneous sea level varies quite a lot on several scales of time and space. This is because the sea is in constant motion, affected by the tides, wind, atmospheric pressure, local gravitational differences, temperature, salinity, and so forth. The easiest way this may be calculated is by selecting a location and calculating the mean sea level at that point and using it as a datum. For example, a period of 19 years of hourly level observations may be averaged and used to determine the mean sea level at some measurement point.

Still-water level or still-water sea level (SWL) is the level of the sea with motions such as wind waves averaged out.
Then MSL implies the SWL further averaged over a period of time such that changes due to, e.g., the tides, also have zero mean. 
Global MSL refers to a spatial average over the entire ocean.

One often measures the values of MSL in respect to the land; hence a change in relative MSL can result from a real change in sea level, or from a change in the height of the land on which the tide gauge operates.
In the UK, the ordnance datum (the 0 metres height on UK maps) is the mean sea level measured at Newlyn in Cornwall between 1915 and 1921. Before 1921, the vertical datum was MSL at the Victoria Dock, Liverpool.
Since the times of the Russian Empire, in Russia and its other former parts, now independent states, the sea level is measured from the zero level of Kronstadt Sea-Gauge. 
In Hong Kong, "mPD" is a surveying term meaning "metres above Principal Datum" and refers to height of 0.146 m above chart datum and 1.304 m below the average sea level.
In France, the Marégraphe in Marseilles measures continuously the sea level since 1883 and offers the longest collated data about the sea level. It is used for a part of continental Europe and the main part of Africa as the official sea level. Spain uses the reference to measure heights below or above sea level at Alicante, and another European vertical elevation reference (European Vertical Reference System) is to the Amsterdam Peil elevation, which dates back to the 1690s.

Satellite altimeters have been making precise measurements of sea level since the launch of TOPEX/Poseidon in 1992. A joint mission of NASA and CNES, TOPEX/Poseidon was followed by Jason-1 in 2001 and the Ocean Surface Topography Mission on the Jason-2 satellite in 2008.

Height above mean sea level  

Height above mean sea level (AMSL) is the elevation (on the ground) or altitude (in the air) of an object, relative to the average sea level datum. It is also used in aviation, where some heights are recorded and reported with respect to mean sea level (MSL) (contrast with flight level), and in the atmospheric sciences, and land surveying. An alternative is to base height measurements on an ellipsoid of the entire Earth, which is what systems such as GPS do. In aviation, the ellipsoid known as World Geodetic System 84 is increasingly used to define heights; however, differences  exist between this ellipsoid height and mean tidal height. The alternative is to use a geoid-based vertical datum such as NAVD88 and the global EGM96 (part of WGS84).

When referring to geographic features such as mountains on a topographic map, variations in elevation are shown by contour lines. The elevation of a mountain denotes the highest point or summit and is typically illustrated as a small circle on a topographic map with the AMSL height shown in metres, feet or both.

In the rare case that a location is below sea level, the elevation AMSL is negative. For one such case, see Amsterdam Airport Schiphol.

Difficulties in use 

To extend this definition far from the sea means comparing the local height of the mean sea surface with a "level" reference surface, or geodetic datum, called the geoid. In a state of rest or absence of external forces, the mean sea level would coincide with this geoid surface, being an equipotential surface of the Earth's gravitational field which, in itself, does not conform to a simple sphere or ellipsoid and exhibits measurable variations such as those measured by NASA's GRACE satellites to determine mass changes in ice-sheets and aquifers. In reality, this ideal does not occur due to ocean currents, air pressure variations, temperature and salinity variations, etc., not even as a long-term average. The location-dependent, but persistent in time, separation between mean sea level and the geoid is referred to as (mean) ocean surface topography. It varies globally in a range of ±2m.

Dry land 

Several terms are used to describe the changing relationships between sea level and dry land. 
 
 "relative" means change relative to a fixed point in the sediment pile.
 "eustatic" refers to global changes in sea level relative to a fixed point, such as the centre of the earth, for example as a result of melting ice-caps.
 "steric" refers to global changes in sea level due to thermal expansion and salinity variations.
 "isostatic" refers to changes in the level of the land relative to a fixed point in the earth, possibly due to thermal buoyancy or tectonic effects; it implies no change in the volume of water in the oceans.

The melting of glaciers at the end of ice ages is one example of eustatic sea level rise. The subsidence of land due to the withdrawal of groundwater is an isostatic cause of relative sea level rise.

Paleoclimatologists can track sea level by examining the rocks deposited along coasts that are very tectonically stable, like the east coast of North America. Areas like volcanic islands are experiencing relative sea level rise as a result of isostatic cooling of the rock which causes the land to sink.

On other planets that lack a liquid ocean, planetologists can calculate a "mean altitude" by averaging the heights of all points on the surface. This altitude, sometimes referred to as a "sea level" or zero-level elevation, serves equivalently as a reference for the height of planetary features.

Change

Local and eustatic 

Local mean sea level (LMSL) is defined as the height of the sea with respect to a land benchmark, averaged over a period of time (such as a month or a year) long enough that fluctuations caused by waves and tides are smoothed out. One must adjust perceived changes in LMSL to account for vertical movements of the land, which can be of the same order (mm/yr) as sea level changes. Some land movements occur because of isostatic adjustment of the mantle to the melting of ice sheets at the end of the last ice age. The weight of the ice sheet depresses the underlying land, and when the ice melts away the land slowly rebounds. Changes in ground-based ice volume also affect local and regional sea levels by the readjustment of the geoid and true polar wander. Atmospheric pressure, ocean currents and local ocean temperature changes can affect LMSL as well.

Eustatic sea level change (as opposed to local change) results in an alteration to the global sea levels due to changes in either the volume of water in the world's oceans or net changes in the volume of the oceanic basins.

Short-term and periodic changes 

There are many factors which can produce short-term (a few minutes to 14 months) changes in sea level. Two major mechanisms are causing sea level to rise. First, shrinking land ice, such as mountain glaciers and polar ice sheets, is releasing water into the oceans. Second, as ocean temperatures rise, the warmer water expands.

Recent changes

Aviation 

Pilots can estimate height above sea level with an altimeter set to a defined barometric pressure. Generally, the pressure used to set the altimeter is the barometric pressure that would exist at MSL in the region being flown over. This pressure is referred to as either QNH or "altimeter" and is transmitted to the pilot by radio from air traffic control (ATC) or an automatic terminal information service (ATIS). Since the terrain elevation is also referenced to MSL, the pilot can estimate height above ground by subtracting the terrain altitude from the altimeter reading. Aviation charts are divided into boxes and the maximum terrain altitude from MSL in each box is clearly indicated. Once above the transition altitude, the altimeter is set to the international standard atmosphere (ISA) pressure at MSL which is 1013.25 hPa or 29.92 inHg.

See also 

 
 
 
 
 
 
 
 
 
 
 
 
 
 
 
  (UK and Ireland)

References

External links 

Sea Level Rise:Understanding the past – Improving projections for the future
Permanent Service for Mean Sea Level
Global sea level change: Determination and interpretation
Environment Protection Agency Sea level rise reports
Properties of isostasy and eustasy
Measuring Sea Level from Space
Rising Tide Video: Scripps Institution of Oceanography
Sea Levels Online: National Ocean Service (CO-OPS)
Système d'Observation du Niveau des Eaux Littorales (SONEL)
Sea level rise – How much and how fast will sea level rise over the coming centuries?

 
Geodesy
Physical oceanography
Oceanographical terminology
Vertical datums